Dreamquest, also known as Luca Turilli's Dreamquest, was a symphonic electro metal band led by Italian musician Luca Turilli, known for his work in the band Rhapsody of Fire (formerly known as Rhapsody). He created the band wanting to propose a style of modern metal combined with the genres he loved the most: pop, electronic and symphonic music. He wrote the lyrics, composed and arranged all the music. For the first time he only presented himself as keyboard player of the band while the guitar parts were handled by Rhapsody of Fire session member Dominique Leurquin.

The music of the band combines powerful metal instrumentation with angelic, operatic, female vocals, modern synths and orchestral elements to create a sound that might best be described as 'symphonic electro pop/metal'. The lyrics are about spirituality and deep inner research, linked in someway to the mystic world of dreams. The identity of the vocalist, credited only as "Myst", was in question. Fans had speculated Mystique's identity to be Bridget Fogle, who contributed to Turilli's 3rd album The Infinite Wonders of Creation, but as of 2020, this was not been confirmed. On August 28, 2021, in his official YouTube channel, Luca Turilli posted a song from the album Lost Horizons called Energy, where in the thumbnail and in the description of the video, he reveals that the vocalist named "Myst" or "Mystique" was none other than the Bridget Fogle herself, who contributed to the album The Infinite Wonders of Creation in 2006.

Shortly after the release of Lost Horizons, Turilli began work on a second Dreamquest album. In December 2006, it was reported that only the mixing was left to be completed. In 2011, however, Turilli ended work on all his various projects to concentrate on the newly formed Luca Turilli's Rhapsody.

Members 
"Mystique" (Bridget Fogle) - vocals
Dominique Leurquin - guitar
Luca Turilli - keyboard
Sascha Paeth - bass
Robert Hunecke-Rizzo - drums

Discography 
 Virus (Single, 2006)
 Lost Horizons (Album, 2006)

See also
Luca Turilli
Rhapsody of Fire
Luca Turilli's Rhapsody

References

External links
Luca Turilli Web Site
Luca Turilli's Dreamquest Web Site

Italian power metal musical groups
Italian symphonic metal musical groups
Musical quintets
Musical groups established in 2005
Musical groups disestablished in 2011